The Randsfjorden Line is an  railway located in Viken county in Norway connecting Drammen to Hønefoss and Hadeland in Innlandet county. The railway is primarily used for passenger trains, and the only scheduled trains on the stretch are Vy Tog express trains on the Bergen Line between Oslo and Bergen. Freight trains to Bergen go to Hønefoss via the Gjøvik Line. The railway is owned by Bane NOR.

The remaining  from Hønefoss to Randsfjorden is not electrified and currently disused. The line gets its name from the lake Randsfjorden.

History
On 11 June 1857, railway director Carl Abraham Pihl was demanded by a Royal Decree to instruct a terrain investigation of the area along the river Drammenselva from Drammen to Randsfjorden. He presented the results of the investigation on 31 May 1858, which concluded that the terrain between Drammen and Randsfjorden was favorable for a rail line.

Pihl thereupon proposed a rail line from Randsfjorden with a branch line to Hen. He argued with forester Thorvald Meiddell, who wanted to construct a canal rather than a rail line. In a meeting on 12 September 1859 in the Drammen chairmanship, the rail line solution was decided upon. On 6 March 1863, the final decision was made, with six against three votes. Parliament passed the construction of the rail line on 11 June 1863, with 65 against 44 votes.

The construction of the Randsfjord Line was begun on 4 December 1863, and, on 1 September 1866, the line was finished to Vikersund. Two years later, the entire line to Randsfjord Station was opened. A celebration took place at the station, where King Charles XV with his family took part.

On 1 December 1867 Skjærdalen and Tyristrand were connected to the line and finally on 12 October 1868 Hønefoss Station opened and the line could stretch all the way to Randsfjorden. The line was the fifth railway line to be built in Norway. When the Bergen Line was built a new line between Roa on Gjøvikbanen and Hønefoss was opened in 1909, providing two different lines between Hønefoss and Oslo.

Images

See also 

 Narrow gauge railways in Norway

References

Bibliography

 
Railway lines in Innlandet
Railway lines in Viken
Railway lines opened in 1866
Electric railways in Norway
1866 establishments in Norway
Sørlandet Line
3 ft 6 in gauge railways in Norway